Říha (feminine Říhová) is a Czech surname. It may refer to:

 Bohumil Říha, Czech writer
 František Říha, Czech canoeist
 Jan Říha, Czech footballer
 Jiří Říha, Czech ice hockey player
 Lukáš Říha, Czech ice hockey player
 Martin Josef Říha, Czech Roman Catholic clergyman
 Miloš Říha, Czech ice hockey player and coach (1958-2020)
Blanka Říhová (born 1942), Czech immunologist

Czech-language surnames